Rubeaten was a sheikhdom and dependency of Upper Yafa.

History 
Rubeaten was a dependency of Upper Yafa since the early 18th century.

In 1873, the Ottoman Empire sent troops into Rubeaten and forced them to pay a yearly tribute.

In July 1901, Rubeaten broke free from being an Ottoman tributary.

In February 1915, during World War I, Rubeaten submitted to the Ottoman invasion and raised the Ottoman flag.

Following the end of World War I in 1918, Rubeaten was annexed by the Mutawakkilite Kingdom of Yemen.

Geography 
Rubeatean was bordered by Juban and Na'wah on the north, and Shaib on the south.

It was divided into 4 districts which spanned a total of 15 villages.

Government 
As of 1905, Rubeaten was ruled by 3 sheikhs:

 Yahia bin Askar bin Abdulla
 Saleh bin Ahmad Ali
 Yahia Nasir Omar Shibren

Demographics 
As of 1905, Rubeaten had a population of 2000.

Military 
As of 1905, Rubeaten had 400 fighting men.

References 

Former countries in Western Asia